The Indian wild ass (Equus hemionus khur), also called the Indian onager or, in the local Gujarati language, Ghudkhur and Khur, is a subspecies of the onager native to South Asia.

It is currently listed as Near Threatened by IUCN. The previous census in 2009 estimated a population of 4,038 Indian wild asses. However, the population was still growing. In December 2014, the population was estimated at 4,451 individuals.  the current  Indian wild ass population has increased to around 4800 individuals in and outside of the Wild Ass Wildlife Sanctuary of India. The population has risen by 37% since 2014, reveals data released by the Gujarat forest department. The population has reached 6,082, according to the census conducted in March 2020.

Physical description
The Indian wild ass, as with most other Asian wild ass subspecies, is quite different from the African wild ass species. The coat is usually sandy, but varies from reddish grey, fawn, to pale chestnut. The animal possesses an erect, dark mane which runs from the back of the head and along the neck. The mane is then followed by a dark brown stripe running along the back, to the root of the tail.

Range and habitat

The Indian wild ass's range once extended from western India, southern Pakistan, i.e. provinces of Sindh and Baluchistan, Afghanistan, and south-eastern Iran. Today, its last refuge lies in the Indian Wild Ass Sanctuary, Little Rann of Kutch and its surrounding areas of the Great Rann of Kutch in the Gujarat state of India. The animal, however, is also seen in the districts of Surendranagar, Banaskantha, Mehsana, and other Kutch districts. Saline deserts (rann), arid grasslands and shrublands are its preferred environments.

Range extension in recent years
The Indian wild ass population has been increasing in numbers and extending its range from Little Rann of Kutch, where the world's last population of this subspecies had got confined to in recent years, and has gradually started moving out and colonizing the Greater Rann of Kutch, also extending into the neighboring Indian State of Rajasthan in the bordering villages in Jalore district bordering the Rann of Kutch of Gujarat and Khejariali and its neighbourhood where a 60 km2 area was transferred to the Rajasthan Forest Department by the revenue authorities in 2007. At this place Rebaris (camel and sheep breeders) live in the Prosopis juliflora jungles in the company of chinkaras, striped hyenas, red foxes, desert cats and Indian wolves.

Biology and behaviour

Indian wild asses graze between dawn and dusk. The animal feeds on grass, leaves and fruits of plant, crop, Prosopis pods, and saline vegetation.

It is one of the fastest of Indian animals, with speeds clocked at about 70 – 80 km. per hour and can easily outrun a jeep.

Stallions live either solitarily, or in small groups of twos and threes while family herds remain large. Mating season is in rainy season. When a mare comes into heat, she separates from the herd with a stallion who battles against rivals for her possession. After few days, the pair returns to the herd. The mare gives birth to one foal. The male foal weans away by 1–2 years of age, while the female continues to stay with the family herd.

Threats
It is unknown how the Indian wild ass disappeared from its former haunts in parts of western India and Pakistan, since the animal was never a hunting target of Indian Maharajas and colonial British officials of the British Raj.  However, India's Mughal Emperors and noblemen from the time took great pleasure in hunting it with Emperor Jahangir in his book Tuzk-e-Jahangiri. In an illustrated copy that has survived of Akbarnama, the book of Mughal Emperor Akbar the Great there is an illustration of Akbar on an Indian wild ass shoot with several of them having been shot by him.

From 1958-1960, the wild ass became a victim of a disease known as surra, caused by Trypanosoma evansi and transmitted by flies, which caused a dramatic decline of its population in India. In November and December 1961, the wild ass population was reduced to just 870 after the outbreak of South African Horse Sickness.

Besides disease, the ass's other threats include habitat degradation due to salt activities, the invasion of the Prosopis juliflora shrub, and encroachment and grazing by the Maldhari. Conservation efforts since 1969 have helped boost the animal's population to more than 4000 individuals.

Conservation 

In the last century, the Indian wild ass lived all over the dry regions of northwestern India and western Pakistan including Jaisalmer, Bikaner, Sind and Baluchistan. Today, it survives only in the Little Rann, and a few stray towards the Great Rann of Kutch with some reaching bordering villages in the Jalore district of the Indian State of Rajasthan.

First census of the wild ass was done in 1940, when there were an estimated 3,500 wild asses. But, by the year 1960, this figure fell to just 362, it was then classified as a highly endangered species. In the years 1973 & 1976, Rann of Kutch and adjoining districts were taken up as the area for conservation for this sub-species also known as Khur. From 1976, the forest department began conducting the wild ass census. Water holes were increased in the area, the forest department has also started a project for having fodder plots though the forest department is yet to get desired success. In 1998, the wild ass population was estimated at 2,940, by the year 2004 it has increased to an estimated 3,863. A recent census conducted by forest department in 2009 has revealed that the population of wild ass in the state was estimated to about 4,038, an increase of 4.53% as compared to 2004. Recently in 2015, the current census of the Indian wild ass population has increased to more than 4,800 individuals in and outside of the Indian Wild Ass Sanctuary.

Of late, it has been spotted right outside Ahmedabad near Nal Sarovar Bird Sanctuary. It seems it is no more confined to the 4,953.71 km2 area of the Rann, but it is now being found right up to the Kala Dungar near Banni grasslands in Kutch and Nal Sarovar. Within the State of Gujarat it is now also found in districts of Surendranagar, Rajkot, Patan, Banaskantha and Kutch. This population of wild asses is the only gene pool of Indian wild asses in the entire world and one of the six geographical varieties or sub-species surviving on the planet.

Reintroduction plans
The population has been growing since 1976 but the wild ass experts warn, long-term trends show intense fluctuations. This area in Kutch, Gujarat is drought-prone due to erratic monsoons, the wild ass population could decline suddenly as a result of a massive die-off. It is only if there are no severe droughts, the species is likely to grow and disperse in the Great Rann and adjoining Rajasthan, habitats that the wild ass occupied in the recent past.

The Gujarat Ecological Education and Research Foundation (GEER) report has recommended that the Thar desert in Rajasthan should be developed as an alternative site for re-establishing the Indian wild ass by reintroduction a few of them there.

Related subspecies
 Mongolian wild ass (khulan), Equus hemionus hemionus
 Turkmenian kulan, Equus hemionus kulan
 Persian onager, Equus hemionus onager
 Syrian wild ass or hemippe, Equus hemionus hemippus (extinct)

See also
 Kiang or Tibetan wild ass

References

Further reading
 Asiatic Wild Ass - Equus hemionus; IUCN/SSC Equid Specialist Group; Species Survival Groups (IUCN.org)
 Rise in Gujarat’s wild ass population, By Jumana Shah, Apr 9, 2009, DNA, India.
The salt of the earth - The Little Rann of Kutch contributes about 60 per cent of the salt manufactured in the country. But Gujarat’s politicians have done little for the Agariya community that produces it; by Manas Dasgupta; April 23, 2009; The Hindu, Online edition of India's National Newspaper
Wild asses population rises by 4%; TNN; 11 April 2009; Times of India
Wild Ass vulnerable to flu; by TNN; 9 April 2009; Times of India
Wild ass census to kick off from April 5; TNN; 31 March 2009; Times of India
Bleak future for traditional salt; by Anosh Malekar; February 21, 2009; Courtesy: Infochange News & Features; ComodittyOnline
Kutch gets biosphere reserve status - The Greater and Little Rann of Kutch have finally got the much-awaited status of biosphere reserve.; Himanshu Kaushik, TNN; July 22, 2008; Economic Times; Times of India
Kutch Branch Canal through sanctuary not to hamper movement of wild ass; Bashir Pathan; February 16, 2008; Indian Express Newspaper
Kutch’s wild ass habitat may soon get heritage label (2 Page article online); by DP Bhattacharya; Jul 26, 2007; Indian Express Newspaper
Salt-makers in Gujarat face eviction; by Virendra Pandit; April 9, 2007; Business Line, Business Daily from The Hindu group of publications
Wild ass robs agarias' livelihood; February 15, 2007; Rediff India Abroad
Indian Wild Ass Sanctuary; Sanctuary Spotlight; March 4, 2006; The Hindu, Online edition of India's National Newspaper. Also posted at Hindu.com
Wild ass population shows upward trend; TNN; April 3, 2004; Times of India
Japanese duo does donkey work in Rann - ‘‘The female donkeys are left by the maldhari’s on the island of Plaswa village in the Rann of Kutch for about three months during the monsoon. Here, the Wild Ass, a protected species, breed with the female donkeys leading to the birth of hybrid donkeys which are taller than their mothers and wilder than their fathers,’’ says Dr R Kimura who has been a visiting researcher at the Equine Museum of Japan for the past two decades.; by Rupam Jain; November 3, 2003; Indian Express Newspaper. Also see Indianexpress.com
Officials gear up for wild ass census; by TNN;  28 November 2003; Times of India
Salt In The Wounds - Gandhi's historic Dandi march has bypassed them. Gujarat's salt workers are caught up in a maze of abysmal living conditions, ignorance and neglect. By Saira Menezes; March 2, 1998; Outlook India Magazine

External links
 Wildlife Times: Indian Wild Ass - Equus hemionus khur
 Trip Record: Photos of Friends on a motorbike trip through Kutch visiting the Great Rann of Kutch passing through Kala Dungar (Black hill), snow white Rann, then they visit the Dholavira Harappan excavation site. Then biking through Banni grasslands they see Indian Wild Ass there and Chari-Dhand Wetland Conservation Reserve. They then Bike to Lakhpat fort village and also Mandvi beach. Also see Superbikerdg.com

Onager
Extinct animals of Pakistan
Fauna of South Asia
Fauna of the Thar Desert
Mammals described in 1827
Taxa named by René Lesson
Mammals of India
Mammals of Pakistan